William Dale Brisson (born August 18, 1946) is a Republican member of the North Carolina House of Representatives. He has represented the 22nd district, covering Bladen County and a portion of Sampson County, since 2007. Brisson lives in Bladen County, North Carolina.

North Carolina House of Representatives
After narrowly losing in 2004, Brisson defeated incumbent Democrat Edd Nye in the 2006 Democratic primary for house district 22, and he ran unopposed in the general election. Brisson defeated primary challenges in the 2008, 2010, 2012, and 2016 elections and defeated his Republican challengers in the 2010 and 2014 elections.

During the 2016 legislative session, Brisson was one of 11 Democrats to vote in favor of House Bill 2, the controversial "Bathroom Bill."

On October 25, 2017 Brisson announced his intention to switch from the Democratic Party to the Republican Party. He cited his district's rural character and the increasing liberalness of the Democratic Party as the reasoning for his decision.

Electoral history

2020

2018

2016

2014

2012

2010

2008

2006

2004

Committee assignments

2021-2022 session
Appropriations (Chair)
Appropriations - General Government (Vice Chair)
Agriculture (Vice Chair)
Energy and Public Utilities 
Health 
Rules, Calendar, and Operations of the House

2019-2020 session
Appropriations (Chair)
Appropriations - Health and Human Services Committee (Vice Chair)
Agriculture (Chair)
Energy and Public Utilities 
Health 
Rules, Calendar, and Operations of the House

2017-2018 session
Appropriations (Vice Chair)
Appropriations - Health and Human Services (Chair)
Agriculture (Vice Chair)
Health (Vice Chair)
Ethics
Health Care Reform
Regulatory Reform
Wildlife Resources (Vice Chair)

2015-2016 session
Appropriations (Vice Chair)
Appropriations - Health and Human Services
Agriculture (Vice Chair)
Health (Vice Chair)
Environment
Ethics
Insurance
Regulatory Reform
Wildlife Resources

2013-2014 session
Appropriations (Vice Chair)
Agriculture (Vice Chair)
Health and Human Services
Rules, Calendar, and Operations of the House
Environment
Ethics
Transportation

2011-2012 session
Appropriations
Agriculture
Health and Human Services
Public Utilities
Transportation

2009-2010 session
Appropriations
Agriculture
Transportation
Wildlife Resources
Mental Health Reform

References

External links

North Carolina General Assembly – Representative William Brisson official NC House website
Project Vote Smart – Representative William Brisson (NC) profile
Follow the Money – William Brisson
2008 2006 2004 campaign contributions

Living people
1946 births
People from Bladen County, North Carolina
Members of the North Carolina House of Representatives
21st-century American politicians
North Carolina Democrats
North Carolina Republicans